Rose Atima Ayaka (born 17 September 1975) is a Ugandan politician, who serves as the elected District Woman Representative for Maracha District, in the 10th Ugandan Parliament (2016 - 2021).

Background and education
Ayaka was born on 17 September 1975. She attended primary school locally. She attended Mvara Secondary School in the city of Arua, for her O-Level studies, graduating in 1989. She then continued with her A-Level education at Muni Girls' Secondary School, also in Arua, obtaining her High School Diploma from there in 1993.

She was then admitted to Makerere University, Uganda's oldest and largest public university, graduating in 1996 with a Bachelor of Arts degree in Social Sciences. In 1999, she attended an Officer Cadet Course at the Uganda Military Academy, in Kabamba, Mubende District, and was awarded a certificate of attendance.

She also has a Certificate in Effective Supervisory Management, awarded by the Eastern and Southern African Management Institute. Her  Postgraduate Diploma in Human Resource Management was obtained from the Uganda Management Institute (UMI) in Kampala, Uganda's capital city. As of 2016, Ayaka was studying to obtain a  Master of Management Studies degree, also at UMI.

Career

Before politics
Ayaka spent over fifteen years before entering politics, working for the Independent Electoral Commission of Uganda. From 1999 until 2000, she worked as the Assistant District Registrar. She then served as the District Registrar from 2000 until 2011. From 2012 until 2015, she was the Regional Election Officer at the Electoral Commission of Uganda.

As a politician
During the 2016 parliamentary elections, Rose Atima Ayaka defeated two other candidates to win the Maracha District Women's Seat in the 10th Parliament. She ran as a member of the ruling National Resistance Movement political party. In the 10th Parliament, she sits on the parliamentary committee on human rights and the  parliamentary committee on health.

Other considerations
She is  a member of the Uganda Women Parliamentary Association (UWOPA). She is interested in promoting education, public health and economic empowerment in her community.

See also
 Zaitun Driwaru
 Peace Proscovia

References

External links
 Website of the Parliament of Uganda

Members of the Parliament of Uganda
Living people
Lugbara people
Women members of the Parliament of Uganda
1975 births
People educated at Mvara Secondary School
Makerere University alumni
Uganda Management Institute alumni
Eastern and Southern African Management Institute alumni
People from Maracha District
People from West Nile sub-region
People from Northern Region, Uganda
National Resistance Movement politicians